Charalambos Aristotelous (Greek: Χαράλαμπος Αριστοτέλους; born 26 January 1995) is a Cypriot footballer who plays for Cypriot club PAEEK as a midfielder. Aristotelous is a product of PAEEK's academy.

Club
Updated 03 September 2016.

References

External links

 Charalambos Aristotelous profile at Cfa.com.cy
 

1995 births
Living people
Cypriot footballers
Anorthosis Famagusta F.C. players
Cypriot First Division players
Association football midfielders